The 1943 Lebanese presidential election was the second presidential election, which was held as a parliamentary session on 21 September 1943. The Constitutional Bechara El Khoury was elected as the only candidate and took office as the sixth president of Greater Lebanon.

The President is elected by the Members of Parliament. He needs a two-thirds majority to win in the first round, while an absolute majority is enough in the second round.

Only 47 deputies out 55 attended the session. El Khoury won the election in the first round, since he got 44 votes, more than the two-thirds needed majority.

References 

Elections in Lebanon
Lebanon
September 1943 events